Hanhee Paik is a South Korean experimental quantum computing researcher who works for IBM Research at the Thomas J. Watson Research Center, where she helps develop superconducting devices for storing and operating on qubits.

Education and career
Paik has a master's degree from Yonsei University in South Korea, and completed a doctorate at the University of Maryland, College Park.

After postdoctoral research at the University of Maryland Laboratory for Physical Sciences, she took a position at Yale University. In 2012 she left academia to become a researcher for BNN Technology PLC, and in 2014 she began her present position at IBM research. At IBM, her work has been included in the IBM Quantum Experience and IBM Q System One projects.

Recognition
In 2021, Paik was named a Fellow of the American Physical Society (APS), after a nomination from the APS Forum on Industrial & Applied Physics, "for pioneering a novel superconducting qubit architecture that catalyzed the commercialization of superconducting quantum computing, and for contributions to advance quantum computing research in the industry".

References

External links

Year of birth missing (living people)
Living people
South Korean women engineers
South Korean physicists
South Korean women scientists
Women physicists
Quantum physicists
Yonsei University alumni
University of Maryland, College Park alumni
Yale University faculty
IBM employees
Fellows of the American Physical Society